Mir Abdoli-ye Olya (also Romanized as Mīr ‘Abdolī-ye ‘Olyā) is a village in Kalashi Rural District, Kalashi District, Javanrud County, Kermanshah Province, Iran. At the 2006 census, its population was 64, in 11 families.

References 

Populated places in Javanrud County